Georgios Vasiliou (born 12 June 1984) is a Cypriot retired footballer who played as left winger and left back.

International career
Vasiliou made his debut with Cyprus national football team on 11 November 2011 in a friendly match against Scotland at Antonis Papadopoulos Stadium.

External links 

1984 births
Living people
Cypriot footballers
Cyprus international footballers
Cypriot First Division players
Aris Limassol FC players
AEP Paphos FC players
Apollon Limassol FC players
Association football midfielders